Rosie Tenison (born December 2, 1968) is an American actress and model.

Personal life and modeling career 
Tenison was born in Caldwell, Idaho. She has three older brothers and an identical twin sister, Renee, who also works as a model. Rosie and Reneé posed in the August 2002 issue of Playboy magazine, together. Rosie was never a Playboy Playmate (whereas Renee was Playmate of the Month for November 1989 and Playmate of the Year for 1990).

Filmography

Film

Television

References

External links
 

1968 births
African-American actresses
American film actresses
American television actresses
Identical twin actresses
People from Caldwell, Idaho
Living people
American twins
21st-century African-American people
21st-century African-American women
20th-century African-American people
20th-century African-American women